The 1978 Western Carolina Catamounts team was an American football team that represented Western Carolina University as a member of the Southern Conference (SoCon) during the 1978 NCAA Division I-A football season. In their 10th year under head coach Bob Waters, the team compiled an overall record of 6–5, with a mark of 4–2 in conference play, tying for third place in the SoCon.

Schedule

References

Western Carolina
Western Carolina Catamounts football seasons
Western Carolina Catamounts football